Walter John William Warne (17 July 1898 – 23 June 1962) was an Australian politician who represented the South Australian House of Assembly multi-member seat of North Adelaide from 1930 to 1933 for the Labor Party.

References

1898 births
1962 deaths
Members of the South Australian House of Assembly
20th-century Australian politicians
Australian Labor Party members of the Parliament of South Australia